Paul Néri (26 February 1917 – 28 January 1979) was an Italian racing cyclist. He rode in the 1947, 1948 and 1949 Tour de France. Italian by birth, he was naturalized French on 5 August 1955.

Major results
1947
 1st Paris–Camembert
 1st Grand Prix de Cannes
1948
 1st Stage 1 Volta a Catalunya
 3rd Tour des Quatre-Cantons
1949
 2nd Paris–Tours
1950
 9th Milan–San Remo

References

External links
 

1917 births
1979 deaths
Italian male cyclists
Sportspeople from Reggio Calabria
Cyclists from Calabria